Dailekh 1 is one of two parliamentary constituencies of Dailekh District in Nepal. This constituency came into existence on the Constituency Delimitation Commission (CDC) report submitted on 31 August 2017.

Incorporated areas 
Dailekh 1 incorporates Gurans Rural Municipality, Dungeshwor Rural Municipality, Bhagwatimai Rural Municipality, Narayan Municipality, Naumule Rural Municipality and Mahabu Rural Municipality.

Assembly segments 
It encompasses the following Karnali Provincial Assembly segment

 Dailekh 1(A)
 Dailekh 1(B)

Members of Parliament

Parliament/Constituent Assembly

Provincial Assembly

1(A)

1(B)

Election results

Election in the 2020s

2022 general election

2022 provincial election

1(A)

1(B)

Election in the 2010s

2017 general election

2017 provincial election

1(A)

1(B)

2013 Constituent Assembly election

Election in the 2000s

2008 Constituent Assembly election

Election in the 1990s

1999 general election

1994 general election

1991 general election

See also 

 List of parliamentary constituencies of Nepal

References

External links 

 Constituency map of Dailekh

Parliamentary constituencies of Nepal
1991 establishments in Nepal
Constituencies established in 1991
Dailekh District